Tumalaytay is an island located in the Philippine island Province of Masbate. The island's population as determined by the 2015 Census was 2,498.

See also

 List of islands of the Philippines

References

Islands of Masbate